Alpine Glow in Dirndlrock is a 1974 West German sex comedy film directed by Sigi Rothemund and starring Elisabeth Volkmann, Rinaldo Talamonti, and Catharina Conti. It is also known as Stop It – I Like It.

Plot
A small Bavarian settlement in the Alps attempts to get boosted to market town status by increasing the population.

Cast

References

Bibliography

External links 
 

1974 films
1970s sex comedy films
German sex comedy films
West German films
1970s German-language films
Films directed by Sigi Rothemund
Films scored by Gerhard Heinz
Films set in the Alps
Films set in Bavaria
Constantin Film films
1974 comedy films
1970s German films